Peirce Crosby (January 16, 1824 – June 15, 1899) was a rear admiral in the United States Navy, whose active duty career included service in the Mexican–American War and the Civil War.

Early life and career
Born in Upper Chichester Township, Delaware County, Pennsylvania, Crosby is a descendant of John Morton, signer of the U.S. Declaration of Independence. Crosby was appointed midshipman in June 1838.  He reached the rank of Lieutenant in September 1853 after a decade and a half in ships of the Home and Mediterranean Squadrons, plus coast survey duty. He served in the sloop-of-war  and the schooner  in the Mexican–American War, and had shore assignments in and around Philadelphia, Pennsylvania.

Civil War
During April–October 1861, as the Civil War ran through its first half year, Crosby served in the sloop of war  and briefly commanded the new gunboat . He went to the Gulf of Mexico as Commanding Officer of the gunboat   at the beginning of 1862.

He finished the war in the Gulf, commanding the gunboat , and took part in clearing mines from Mobile Bay.

Post-Civil War activities
Commander Crosby spent the first three years of the post-Civil War era in the south Atlantic as Commanding Officer of the gunboat . Following promotion to Captain in May 1868, he had a variety of shore assignments and, in 1872–1873, commanded the steamer . In 1877–1881, in the rank of Commodore, Crosby was commandant of the League Island (Philadelphia) Navy Yard.

Flag assignments and retirement
He finished his active career as a Rear Admiral, commanding the South Atlantic Squadron in 1882–1883 and the Asiatic Squadron later in 1883. In October of the latter year he was placed on the Retired List.

Late in his life, Admiral Crosby served as the Assistant Secretary of State in Washington, D.C.

Admiral Crosby was an early member of the Military Order of Foreign Wars and one of a very few members who were veterans of the Mexican War.

Admiral Peirce Crosby died at Washington, D.C., on June 15, 1899 and is buried in Arlington National Cemetery.

Namesake
The destroyer  was named after him.

References

 
 

1824 births
1899 deaths
United States Navy rear admirals (upper half)
United States Navy personnel of the Mexican–American War
Union Navy officers
People from Upper Chichester Township, Pennsylvania
People of Pennsylvania in the American Civil War
Burials at Arlington National Cemetery